Aija Tērauda (born December 28) is a Latvian model, actress and film producer.

Early life
Aija Terauda was born in Riga, Latvia. She began her modeling career at the age of 16, working for modeling agency Natalie, which led her to work in Milan, Italy and New York City. Terauda is fluent in Latvian, Russian and English. She also learned Italian and Finnish while living and working in those countries. After living in Europe, Terauda moved to New York City to study acting at HB Studio and MTB Studio. She obtained a Bachelor of Arts in Economics and International Studies at the City College of New York and studied at Columbia University.

Career
Terauda landed her first role playing a model in Spider-Man 3. She appears in Martin Scorsese's television series Boardwalk Empire. Terauda also worked in Riga, Latvia with Hallmark Productions in the television film The Courageous Heart of Irena Sendler directed by John Kent Harrison. She plays a leading role in the Derek Estlin Purvis film Airtight, which she also produced.
Terauda has been cover model for many European and American magazines including Talent in Motion (November 2011) and Millennium Magazine (March 2012).

Personal life

Terauda married Derek Estlin Purvis on December 13, 2013. The couple has one child.

Filmography

References

External links 

 
 

Living people
Year of birth missing (living people)
Models from Riga
Latvian female models
Latvian film actresses
21st-century Latvian actresses
Latvian film producers
Latvian emigrants to the United States
American film actresses
American television actresses
21st-century American actresses
American women film producers
Female models from California
Film producers from California
Actresses from Los Angeles